Anna de Belocca (née de Bellokh) (4 January 1854 – unknown) was a Russian-born operatic contralto.

Biography
She was born in St.Petersburg, where her father  was an Imperial Russian Councilor of State. After studying in St. Petersburg with Henriette Nissen-Saloman and in Paris with Nicolas Lablache and Maurice Strakosch, she made her stage debut in Paris at the Théâtre Italien as Rosina The Barber of Seville. She also appeared there in the title role of La Cenerentola and as Arsace in Semiramide. She appeared in various cities in Europe, including London, where she made her debut with Mapleson's company. She then became a member of the Strakosch Opera Company with whom she made her American debut on 17 April 1876 as Rosina at New York's Academy of Music. She also appeared in concerts in Boston, Chicago, Philadelphia and San Francisco. With the Mapleson company, she continued to sing leading roles in New York and Philadelphia through the 1880s.

References
Hurst, P. G. The Operatic Age of Jean de Reszke: Forty Years of Opera, 1874-1914, McBride, 1959. 
Lahee, Henry Charles, Famous singers of to-day and yesterday, L.C. Page, 1908.
The New York Times,  "A New Prima Donna", 4 April 1876.
The New York Times, "Musical and Dramatic: The Italian Opera, 18 April 1876.
The Chicago Tribune, 16 April 1876, Page 12
San Francisco Chronicle, 13 July 1876, Page 3
Tompkins, Eugene, The history of the Boston Theatre, 1854-1901, Houghton Mifflin, 1908

External links
Portrait and brief biography on www.picturehistory.com

1854 births
Year of death unknown
19th-century women opera singers from the Russian Empire
Operatic contraltos
Women singers from the Russian Empire
Singers from Saint Petersburg